The 2017 in cycling results is given as follows:

Cycle ball

2017 Continental and World Cycle-ball events
 May 20: 2017 UEC Elite Cycle Ball European Championships in  Darmstadt
 Winners:  (Patrick Schnetzer & Markus Bröll)
 May 26 & 27: 2017 UEC Juniors Indoor Cycling European Championships in  Prague
 Elite single artistic cycling winners:  Tim Weber (m) /  Lorena Schneider (f)
 Mixed single artistic cycling winners:  (Julia Dörner, Pia Pollinger, Annamaria Milo, & Anna-Lena Vollbrecht)
 Elite women's pair artistic cycling winners:  (Pia Seidel & Lea Marie Andexlinger)
 Mixed pair artistic cycling winners:  (Matthias & Michael Quecke)
 Junior men's cycle ball winners:  (Max Rückschloß & Eric Haedicke)
 September 16: 2017 UEC U23 Cycle Ball European Championships in  Dorlisheim
 Winners:  (Stefan Feurstein & Kevin Bachmann)
 November 24–26: 2017 UCI Indoor Cycling World Championships in  Dornbirn
 Elite Single Artistic Cycling winners:  Lukas Kohl (m) /  Milena Slupina (f)
 Women's Pair Artistic Cycling winners:  (Julia Thürmer & Nadja Thürmer)
 Mixed Elite Artistic Cycling winners:  (Céline Burlet, Flavia Zuber, Jennifer Schmid, & Melanie Schmid)
 Mixed Elite Pair Artistic Cycling winners:  (Max Hanselmann & Serafin Schefold)
 Men's Cycle-ball winners:  (Bernd Mlady & Gerhard Mlady)

2017 UCI Cycle-ball World Cup
 May 6: CBWC #1 in  Beringen
 Winners:  (André Kopp & Manuel Kopp)
 August 26: CBWC #2 in  Altdorf
 Winners:  (Dominik Planzer & Roman Schneider)
 September 2: CBWC #3 in  Sankt Pölten
 Winners:  (Gerhard Mlady & Bernd Mlady)
 October 14: CBWC #4 in  St. Gallen
 Winners:  (Patrick Schnetzer & Markus Bröll)
 November 4: CBWC #5 in  Liestal
 Winners:  (Patrick Schnetzer & Markus Bröll)
 December 2: CBWC #6 (final) in  Willich
 Winners:  (Patrick Schnetzer & Markus Bröll)

Cycling – BMX

2017 Continental and World BMX events
 March 4: 2017 Oceania BMX Continental Championships in  Bathurst
 Elite winners:  Kai Sakakibara (m) /  Leanna Curtis (f)
 Junior winners:  Maynard Peel (m) /  Saya Sakakibara (f)
 May 28 & 29: 2017 Asian BMX Continental Championships in  Suphan Buri
 Elite winners:  Jukia Yoshimura (m) /  LU Yan (f)
 Junior winners:  Taichi Ikegami (m) /  Sae Hatakeyama (f)
 June 3: 2017 Pan American BMX Continental Championships in  Santiago del Estero
 Elite winners:  Exequiel Torres (m) /  Gabriela Díaz (f)
 Junior winners:  Samuel Zuleta Vasco (m) /  Paola Reis (f)
 July 14–16: 2017 European BMX Continental Championships in  Bordeaux
 Elite winners:  Joris Daudet (m) /  Laura Smulders (f)
 Junior winners:  Cédric Butti (m) /  Blaine Ridge-Davis (f)
 July 25–29: 2017 UCI BMX World Championships in  Rock Hill, South Carolina
 Elite winners:  Corben Sharrah (m) /  Alise Post (f)
 Junior winners:  Cédric Butti (m) /  Bethany Shriever (f)

2017 UCI BMX Supercross World Cup
 May 6 & 7: BMXWC #1 & #2 in  Papendal
 Men's Elite winners:  Sylvain André (#1) /  Joris Daudet (#2)
 Women's Elite winner:  Laura Smulders (2 times)
 May 13 & 14: BMXWC #3 & #4 in  Heusden-Zolder
 Men's Elite winners:  Connor Fields (#1) /  Twan van Gendt (#2)
 Women's Elite winners:  Mariana Pajón (#1) /  Laura Smulders (#2)
 September 16 & 17: BMXWC #5 & #6 (final) in  Santiago del Estero
 Men's Elite winners:  Exequiel Torres (#1) /  Connor Fields (#2)
 Women's Elite winner:  Mariana Pajón (2 times)

2017 UEC BMX European Cup
 April 1 & 2: UEC BMX European Cup #1 & #2 in  Heusden-Zolder
 Elite winners:  David Graf (m; 2 times) /  Laura Smulders (f; 2 times)
 Men's Junior winners:  Kay Stindl (#1) /  Cédric Butti (#2)
 Women's Junior winner:  Bethany Shriever (2 times)
 April 28 – 30: UEC BMX European Cup #3 & #4 in  Erp
 Men's Elite winner:  Niek Kimmann (2 times)
 Women's Elite winners:  Laura Smulders (#1) /  Natalia Afremova (#2)
 Men's Junior winners:  Cédric Butti (#1) /  Maynard Peel (#2)
 Women's Junior winner  Bethany Shriever (2 times)
 May 19 – 21: UEC BMX European Cup #5 & #6 in  Prague
 Elite winners:  Joris Harmsen (m; 2 times) /  Laura Smulders (f; 2 times)
 Men's Junior winner:  Mikus Strazdins (2 times) 
 Women's Junior winners:  Vineta Petersone (#1) /  Blaine Ridge-Davis (#2)
 June 2–4: UEC BMX European Cup #7 & #8 in  Verona
 Men's Elite winners:  Kyle Evans (#1) /  Tore Navrestad (#2)
 Women's Elite winners:  Mariana Pajón (#1) /  Laura Smulders (#2)
 Men's Junior winners:  Cédric Butti (#1) /  Kye Whyte (#2)
 Women's Junior winners:  Sae Hatakeyama (#1) /  Bethany Shriever (#2)
 June 16–18: UEC BMX European Cup #9 & #10 (finals) in  Sandness
 Men's Elite winners:  Kyle Evans (#1) /  Tore Navrestad (#2)
 Women's Elite winners:  Simone Christensen (#1) /  Yaroslava Bondarenko (#2)
 Men's Junior winner:  Kevin van de Groenendaal (2 times)
 Women's Junior winners:  Vineta Petersone (#1) /  Silje Gloslie Fiskbekk (#2)

Cycling – Cyclo-cross

2016–17 International Cyclo-cross events
 October 29, 2016: 2016 UCI Pan-American Cyclo-cross Continental Championships in  Covington, Kentucky (debut event)
 Elite winners:  Stephen Hyde (m) /  Katie Compton (f)
 U23 winners:  Curtis White (m) /  Ellen Noble (f)
 Men's Junior winner:  Denzel Stephenson
 October 29 & 30, 2016: 2016 UEC Cyclo-cross European Championships in  Pontchâteau
 Elite winners:  Toon Aerts (m) /  Thalita de Jong (f)
 U23 winners:  Quinten Hermans (m) /  Chiara Teocchi (f)
 Men's Junior winner:  Tom Pidcock
 December 2 & 3, 2016: 2016 UCI Masters Cyclo-cross World Championships in  Mol, Belgium
 For results, click here.
 January 28 & 29: 2017 UCI Cyclo-cross World Championships in  Bieles
 Elite winners:  Wout van Aert (m) /  Sanne Cant (f)
 U23 winners:  Joris Nieuwenhuis (m) /  Annemarie Worst (f)
 Men's Junior winner:  Tom Pidcock

2016–17 UCI Cyclo-cross World Cup
 September 21, 2016: #1 in  Las Vegas
 Elite winners:  Wout van Aert (m) /  Sophie de Boer (f)
 September 24, 2016: #2 in  Iowa City, Iowa
 Elite winners:  Wout van Aert (m) /  Katie Compton (f)
 October 23, 2016: #3 in  Valkenburg aan de Geul
 Elite winners:  Mathieu van der Poel (m) /  Thalita de Jong (f)
 November 20, 2016: #4 in  Koksijde
 Event cancelled, due to safety issues.
 November 26, 2016: #5 in  Zeven
 Elite winners:  Mathieu van der Poel (m) /  Sanne Cant (f)
 December 18, 2016: #6 in  Namur
 Elite winners:  Mathieu van der Poel (m) /  Kateřina Nash (f)
 December 26, 2016: #7 in  Heusden-Zolder
 Elite winners:  Wout van Aert (m) /  Marianne Vos (f)
 January 15: #8 in  Fiuggi
 Elite winners:  Wout van Aert (m) /  Marianne Vos (f)
 January 22: #9 (final) in  Hoogerheide
 Elite winners:  Lars van der Haar (m) /  Marianne Vos (f)

2016–17 Cyclo-cross Superprestige
 October 2, 2016: #1 in  Gieten
 Elite winners:  Mathieu van der Poel (m) /  Sanne Cant (f)
 U–23 winner:  Joris Nieuwenhuis
 Junior winner:  Jelle Camps
 October 16, 2016: #2 in  Zonhoven
 Elite winners:  Mathieu van der Poel (m) /  Sanne Cant (f)
 U–23 winner:  Quinten Hermans
 Junior winner:  Thomas Pidcock
 November 6, 2016: #3 in  Oostkamp
 Elite winners:  Mathieu van der Poel (m) /  Sophie de Boer (f)
 U–23 winner:  Quinten Hermans
 Junior winner:  Toon Vandebosch
 November 13, 2016: #4 in  Gavere
 Elite winners:  Mathieu van der Poel (m) /  Sanne Cant (f)
 U-23 winner:  Eli Iserbyt
 Junior winner:  Toon Vandebosch
 December 3, 2016: #5 in  Spa-Francorchamps
 Elite winners:  Wout van Aert (m) /  Thalita de Jong (f)
 U-23 winner:  Quinten Hermans
 Junior winner:  Toon Vandebosch
 December 23, 2016: #6 in  Diegem
 Elite winners:  Mathieu van der Poel (m) /  Marianne Vos (f)
 U-23 winner:  Quinten Hermans
 Junior winner:  Jelle Camps
 February 5: #7 in  Hoogstraten
 Elite winners:  Mathieu van der Poel (m) /  Sophie de Boer (f)
 U–23 winner:  Joris Nieuwenhuis
 Junior winner:  Jelle Camps
 February 11: #8 (final) in  Middelkerke
 Elite winners:  Mathieu van der Poel (m) /  Sanne Cant (f)
 U–23 winner:  Joris Nieuwenhuis
 Junior winner:  Jelle Camps

2016–17 DVV Trophy
 October 9, 2016: #1 in  Ronse
 Elite winners:  Wout van Aert (m) /  Thalita de Jong (f)
 U-23 winner:  Joris Nieuwenhuis
 Junior winner:  Yentl Bekaert
 November 1, 2016: #2 in  Oudenaarde
 Elite winners:  Wout van Aert (m) /  Jolien Verschueren (f)
 U-23 winner:  Eli Iserbyt
 Junior winner:  Thomas Mein
 November 27, 2016: #3 in  Hamme
 Elite winners:  Mathieu van der Poel (m) /  Sanne Cant (f)
 U-23 winner:  Quinten Hermans
 Junior winner:  Thomas Pidcock
 December 10, 2016: #4 in  Essen
 Elite winners:  Wout van Aert (m) /  Sanne Cant (f)
 U-23 winner:  Eli Iserbyt
 Junior winner:  Jelle Camps
 December 17, 2016: #5 in  Antwerp
 Elite winners:  Mathieu van der Poel (m) /  Sanne Cant (f)
 U-23 winner:  Quinten Hermans
 Junior winner:  Arne Vrachten
 December 29, 2016: #6 in  Loenhout
 Elite winners:  Mathieu van der Poel (m) /  Sanne Cant (f)
 U-23 winner:  Eli Iserbyt
 Junior winner:  Toon Vandebosch
 January 1: #7 in  Baal
 Elite winners:  Toon Aerts (m) /  Marianne Vos (f)
 U-23 winner:  Eli Iserbyt
 Junior winner:  Jelle Camps
 February 4: #8 (final) in  Lille
 Elite winners:  Mathieu van der Poel (m) /  Maud Kaptheijns (f)
 U-23 winner:  Quinten Hermans
 Junior winner:  Florian Vermeersch

Cycling – Mountain Bike

World mountain biking events
 June 24 & 25: 2017 UCI Mountain Bike Marathon World Championships in  Singen
 Elite winners:  Alban Lakata (m) /  Annika Langvad (f)
 September 5–10: 2017 UCI Mountain Bike World Championships in  Cairns
  won the gold medal tally. Switzerland and  won 8 overall medals each.

Continental mountain biking events
 March 10–12: 2017 Oceania Continental Championships in  Toowoomba
 Elite XCO winners:  Anton Cooper (m) /  Samara Sheppard (f)
 U23 XCO winners:  Ben Bradley (m) /  Megan Williams (f)
 Juniors XCO winners:  Sam Fox (m) /  Jessica Manchester (f)
 Elite Downhill winners:  Josh Button (m) /  Danielle Beecroft (f)
 Juniors Downhill winners:  Joshua Clark (m) /  Shania Rawson (f)
 March 29 – April 2: 2017 American Continental Championships in  Paipa–Boyacá
 Elite XCO winners:  Catriel Soto (m) /  Erin Huck (f)
 U23 XCO winners:  Gerardo Ulloa (m) /  Luciana Roland (f)
 Juniors XCO winners:  Martin Vidaurre Kossman (m) /  Mónica Rodríguez (f)
 XCE winners:  Santiago Mesa Pietralunga (m) /  Michela Molina (f)
 Elite Downhill winners:  Rafael Gutiérrez Villegas (m) /  Lorena Dromundo (f)
 Juniors Downhill winners:  Maicon Jesus Pradella (m) /  Maria Sánchez Gómez (f)
 XCR winners:  (Gerardo Ulloa, Rafael Escárcega, Daniela Campuzano, Monserrath Rodríguez Suárez, Fernando Islas López)
 May 9 – 14: 2017 African Mountain Bike Continental Championships in 
 Elite XCO winners:  Alan Hatherly (m) /  Michelle Vorster (f)
 Men's Junior XCO winner:  Rossouw Bekker 
 U23 XCO winners:  Tristan de Lange (m) /  Skye Davidson (f)
 Women's Elite XCM winner:  Aurelie Halbwachs
 May 13 & 14: 2017 Asian Continental Championships in  Xuancheng
 Men's Elite XCO winner:  LYU Xianjing
 Junior XCO winners:  KIM Mi-no (m) /  Urara Kawaguchi (f)
 Elite Downhill winners:  Yuki Kushima (m) /  Vipavee Deekaballes (f)
 Mixed Elite XCR winners:  (MA Hao, Bieken Nazaerbieke, XU Duibing, WEI Qianqian, WANG Zhen)
 May 27 & 28: 2017 European Continental Championships (DHI only) in  Sestola
 Elite Downhill winners:  Florent Payet (m) /  Eleonora Farina (f)
 July 27–30: 2017 European Continental Championships (XCO, XCE, & XCR only) in  Istanbul
 Elite XCO winners:  Florian Vogel (m) /  Yana Belomoyna (f)
 Junior XCO winners:  Jofre Cullell Estape (m) /  Laura Stigger (f)
 U23 XCO winners:  Gioele Bertolini (m) /  Sina Frei (f)
 Elite XCE winners:  Titouan Perrin Ganier (m) /  Kathrin Stirnemann (f)
 Mixed Elite XCR winners:  (Joel Roth, Linda Indergand, Filippo Colombo, Alessandra Keller, Andri Frischknecht)
 August 27 & 28: 2017 Masters DHI MTB European Championships in  Sestola
 Masters winners:  Micha Sliwa (m) /  Alice Kuhne (f)
 December 10: 2017 MTB Beachrace European Championships in  Scheveningen
 Elite winners:  Jasper Ockeloen (m) /  Riejanne Markus (f)

2017 UCI Mountain Bike World Cup
 April 29 & 30: #1 in  Lourdes
 Elite downhill winners:  Alexandre Fayolle (m) /  Rachel Atherton (f)
 Junior downhill winners:  Finnley Iles (m) /  Mélanie Chappaz (f)
 May 20 & 21: #2 in  Nové Město na Moravě
 Elite XCO winners:  Nino Schurter (m) /  Annika Langvad (f)
 U23 XCO winners:  Petter Fagerhaug (m) /  Kate Courtney (f)
 May 27 & 28: #3 in  Albstadt
 Elite XCO winners:  Nino Schurter (m) /  Yana Belomoyna (f)
 U23 XCO winners:  Nadir Colledani (m) /  Evie Richards (f)
 June 3 & 4: #4 in  Fort William
 Elite downhill winners:  Greg Minnaar (m) /  Tracey Hannah (f)
 Junior downhill winners:  Matt Walker (m) /  Megan James (f)
 June 10 & 11: #5 in  Leogang
 Elite downhill winners:  Aaron Gwin (m) /  Tahnee Seagrave (f)
 Junior downhill winners:  Finnley Iles (m) /  Paula Zibasa (f)
 July 1 & 2: #6 in  Vallnord
 Elite XCO winners:  Nino Schurter (m) /  Yana Belomoyna (f)
 U23 XCO winners:  Simon Andreassen (m) /  Sina Frei (f)
 Elite downhill winners:  Troy Brosnan (m) /  Myriam Nicole (f)
 Junior downhill winners:  Finnley Iles (m) /  Megan James (f)
 July 8 & 9: #7 in  Lenzerheide
 Elite downhill winners:  Greg Minnaar (m) /  Myriam Nicole (f)
 Junior downhill winners:  Finnley Iles (m) /  Paula Zibasa (f)
 August 5 & 6: #8 in  Mont-Sainte-Anne
 Elite XCO winners:  Nino Schurter (m) /  Yana Belomoyna (f)
 U23 XCO winners:  Martins Blums (m) /  Kate Courtney (f)
 Elite downhill winners:  Aaron Gwin (m) /  Tahnee Seagrave (f)
 Junior downhill winners:  Finnley Iles (m) /  Mélanie Chappaz (f)
 August 26 & 27: #9 (final) in  Val di Sole
 Elite XCO winners:  Nino Schurter (m) /  Jolanda Neff (f)
 U23 XCO winners:  Nadir Colledani (m) /  Kate Courtney (f)
 Elite downhill winners:  Aaron Gwin (m) /  Tahnee Seagrave (f)
 Junior downhill winners:  Finnley Iles (m) /  Mélanie Chappaz (f)

Cycling – Para-cycling

Para-cycling Road World Championships
 August 31 – September 3: 2017 UCI Para-cycling Road World Championships in  Pietermaritzburg
 For results, click here.

2017 UCI Para-cycling Road World Cup
 May 11 – 14: PARAWC #1 in  Maniago
 May 19 – 21: PARAWC #2 in  Ostend
 June 30 – July 2: PARAWC #3 (final) in  Emmen
 Note: The results for all three events mentioned above, click here.

2017 Para-cycling European Cup
 April 8 & 9: PARAEC #1 in  Šid
 For full results click, here.
 July 15 & 16: PARAEC #2 in  Elzach
 September 16 & 17: PARAEC #3 in  Belgrade
 September 30 & October 1: PARAEC #4 (final) in  Prague

Cycling – Road

UCI Road World Championships
 September 16–24: 2017 UCI Road World Championships in  Bergen
 The  won the gold medal tally.  won the overall medal tally.

Continental cycling championships
 February 13 – 19: 2017 African Continental Cycling Championships in 
 Elite Road Race winners:  Willie Smit (m) /  Aurelie Halbwachs (f)
 Juniors Road Race winners:  Hamza Mansouri (m) /  Haftu Hailu Zayd (f)
 Elite ITT winners:  Meron Teshome (m) /  Aurelie Halbwachs (f)
 Elite TTT winners:  (m) /  (f)
 Juniors ITT winners:  Hamza Mansouri (m) /  Kasahun Tsadkan Gebremedhn (f)
 Juniors TTT winners:  (m) /  (f)
 February 25 – March 2: 2017 Asian Cycling Championships in 
 Elite Road Race winners:  Park Sang-hong (m) /  Yang Qianyu (f)
 U23 Road Race winners:  Hayato Okamoto (m) /  Chiayun Li (f)
 Juniors Road Race winners:  Daniil Marukhin (m) /  Chang Yue (f)
 Elite ITT winners:  Dmitriy Gruzdev (m) /  Liang Hongyu (f)
 U23 ITT winners:  Rei Onodera (m) /  Yekaterina Yuraitis (f)
 Juniors ITT winners:  Igor Chzhan (m) /  Qiao Kang (f)
 Elite TTT winners: 
 March 9–11: 2017 Oceanian Cycling Championships in 
 Elite Road Race winners:  Sean Lake (m) /  Lisen Hockings (f)
 Juniors Road Race winners:  Sebastian Berwick (m) /  Madeleine Fasnacht (f)
 Men's U23 Road Race winner:  Lucas Hamilton 
 Elite ITT winners:  Sean Lake (m) /  Lucy Kennedy (f)
 U23 ITT winners:  Liam Magennis (m) /  Jaime Gunning (f)
 May 4 – 7: 2017 Pan American Road and Track Championships in the 
 Women's Elite Road Race winner:  Paola Muñoz
 Men's U23 Road Race winner:  Matias Muñoz
 Men's U23 ITT winner:  Jose Alexis Roderiguez Villalobos
 Elite ITT winners:  José Luis Rodríguez Aguilar (m) /  Chloé Dygert (f)
 August 2–6: 2017 European Road Championships in 
 Elite Road Race winners:  Alexander Kristoff (m) /  Marianne Vos (f)
 Junior Road Race winners:  Michele Gazzoli (m) /  Lorena Wiebes (f)
 U23 Road Race winners:  Casper Pedersen (m) /  Pernille Mathiesen (f)
 Elite ITT winners:  Victor Campenaerts (m) /  Ellen van Dijk (f)
 Junior ITT winners:  Andreas Leknessund (m) /  Elena Pirrone (f)
 U23 ITT winners:  Kasper Asgreen (m) /  Pernille Mathiesen (f)

Grand Tours
 May 5 – 28: 2017 Giro d'Italia
 Winner:  Tom Dumoulin (Team Sunweb) (first Grand Tour win)
 July 1–23: 2017 Tour de France
 Winner:  Chris Froome (Team Sky) (fourth Grand Tour win)
 August 19 – September 10: 2017 Vuelta a España
 Winner:  Chris Froome (Team Sky) (first Vuelta a España win; fifth Grand Tour win)

UCI World Tour

 Overall winner:  Greg Van Avermaet

UCI Women's WorldTour

 Overall winner:  Anna van der Breggen

UCI Continental Tours
 October 22, 2016 – October 22, 2017: 2017 UCI Asia Tour Overall winner:  Benjamín Prades
 October 24, 2016 – November 5: 2017 UCI America Tour Overall winner:  Serghei Țvetcov
 October 28, 2016 – November 5: 2017 UCI Africa Tour Overall winner:  Willie Smit
 January 22 – March 11: 2017 UCI Oceania Tour Overall winner:  Lucas Hamilton
 January 26 – October 17: 2017 UCI Europe Tour Overall winner:  Nacer Bouhanni

Cycling – Track

International track cycling events
 February 6 – 10: 2017 Asian Cycling Championships in  New Delhi
  won the gold medal tally.  won the overall medal tally.
 March 20–24: 2017 African Track Cycling Championships in  Durban
  won both the gold and overall medal tallies.
 April 12 – 16: 2017 UCI Track Cycling World Championships in 
Australia won the overall medal tally.
 October 19–22: 2017 UEC European Track Championships in  Berlin
  and  won 5 gold medals each. Germany won the overall medal tally.

2016–17 UCI Track Cycling World Cup
 November 4–6, 2016: #1 in  Glasgow
 Keirin winners:  Tomáš Bábek (m) /  Simona Krupeckaitė (f)
 Madison winners:  (m) /  (f)
 Sprint winners:  Kamil Kuczyński (m) /  Simona Krupeckaitė (f)
 Team pursuit winners:  (m) /  (f)
 Team sprint winners:  (m) /  (f)
 Men's Points race:  Cameron Meyer
 Men's 4 km individual pursuit:  Sylvain Chavanel
 Women's Scratch winner:  Élise Delzenne
 November 11–13, 2016: #2 in  Apeldoorn
 Keirin winners:  Tomáš Bábek (m) /  Lyubov Shulika (f)
 Sprint winners:  Andriy Vynokurov (m) /  Lee Wai Sze (f)
 Team sprint winners:  (m) /  (f)
 Men's Madison winners: 
 Men's Omnium winner:  Szymon Sajnok
 Men's Scratch winner:  Raman Ramanau
 Men's team pursuit winners: 
 Women's 500 m time trial winner:  Pauline Grabosch
 Women's Points race:  Elinor Barker
 February 17 – 19: #3 in  Cali
 Keirin winners:  Fabián Puerta (m) /  Kristina Vogel (f)
 Omnium winners:  Sam Welsford (m) /  Lotte Kopecky (f)
 Points race winners:  Mark Downey (m) /  Amy Cure (f)
 Sprint winners:  Denis Dmitriev (m) /  Kristina Vogel
 Team pursuit winners:  (m) /  (f)
 Team sprint winners:  (m) /  (f)
 Men's 1 km Time Trial winner:  Krzysztof Maksel
 Men's Madison winners: 
 Women's Scratch winner:  Sarah Hammer
 February 25 & 26: #4 (final) in  Los Angeles
 Keirin winners:  Fabián Puerta (m) /  Kristina Vogel (f)
 Madison winners:  (m) /  (f)
 Scratch Winners:  Yauheni Karaliok (m) /  Tetyana Klimchenko (f)
 Sprint winners:  Denis Dmitriev (m) /  Kristina Vogel (f)
 Team sprint winners:  (m) /  (f)
 Men's Omnium winner:  Szymon Sajnok
 Women's Pursuit winner:  Chloé Dygert
 Women's team pursuit winners: The

Cycling – Trials

2017 UCI Trials World Cup
 May 20 & 21: Trials WC #1 in  Aalter
 20" winners:  Abel Mustieles Garcia (m) /  Nina Reichenbach (f)
 26" winner:  Gilles Coustellier
 July 8 & 9: Trials WC #2 in  Vöcklabruck
 20" winners:  Abel Mustieles Garcia (m) /  Nina Reichenbach (f)
 26" winner:  Jack Carthy
 July 29 & 30: Trials WC #3 in  Les Menuires
 20" winners:  Benito Jose Ros Charral (m) /  Manon Basseville (f)
 26" winner:  Nicolas Vallee
 August 26 & 27: Trials WC #4 in  Albertville
 20" winners:  Abel Mustieles Garcia (m) /  Nina Reichenbach (f)
 26" winner:  Gilles Coustellier
 September 23 & 24: Trials WC #5 (final) in  Antwerp
 20" winners:  Abel Mustieles Garcia (m) /  Nina Reichenbach (f)
 26" winner:  Jack Carthy

References

External links
 Union Cycliste Internationale - UCI - Official Site

 
2017 in sports
Cycle sport by year